Jeffery Francis Beardsall (1940 in Hereford, England) is an artist (painter). He was recipient of a John Simon Guggenheim Fellowship in 1975.

Awards and prizes
For his work Beardsall was rewarded several international prizes and awards:
John S. Guggenheim Fellowship (USA)
Print Making Award (England)
Post Graduate Print Making Award (England)
The Samuel Biggin Painting Prize (England)

His works are owned by international museums, such as Musée d'Art et d'Histoire, Whitney Museum of American Art, Museum of Modern Art Towers in New York, Staatsgalerie Stuttgart.

Publications and literature 
Artist Proof, 1970
The Print Collectors Newsletter, 1975, 1976, 1978
SKY, 1976
Art in America, Jan. 1980
Grand Reportage, 1981
Architectural Digest, 1975, 1983, 1984

References

External links 

Living people
1940 births